Cymbalophora haroldi is a moth of the family Erebidae first described by Charles Oberthür in 1911. It is found in Morocco and Algeria.

References

Callimorphina
Moths described in 1911